Antonija Kaleb (born ) is a Croatian volleyball player. She is a member of the Croatia women's national volleyball team.

She was part of the Croatian national team at the 2014 FIVB Volleyball Women's World Championship in Italy,  and played for Jakarta BNI 46 in 2014.

Clubs
  OK Pula (2001-2006)
  OK Rijeka (2006-2008)
  Dauphines Charleroi (2008-2009)
  Volero Zurich (2009)
  Universitate Craiova (2009-2010)
  Karsiyaka S.K. (2010-2011)
  Hainaut Volley (2011-2013)
  Jakarta BNI 46 (2013-2015)

References

1986 births
Living people
Croatian women's volleyball players
Place of birth missing (living people)
Expatriate volleyball players in Belgium
Croatian expatriate sportspeople in Indonesia
Middle blockers
Croatian expatriate sportspeople in Belgium
Croatian expatriate sportspeople in Switzerland
Croatian expatriate sportspeople in Romania
Croatian expatriate sportspeople in Turkey
Croatian expatriate sportspeople in France
Expatriate volleyball players in Switzerland
Expatriate volleyball players in Romania
Expatriate volleyball players in Turkey
Expatriate volleyball players in France
Expatriate volleyball players in Indonesia